Christian de Jesús Valdez Loaiza (born 5 May 1984) is a former Mexican professional footballer who last played as a midfielder for Jaguares de Jalisco.

Career

Puebla
In December 2015, Puebla announced that Valdez would be joining the team on loan from Morelia.

Honours
Morelia
Copa MX: Apertura 2013
Supercopa MX: 2014

References

External links
 
 

1984 births
Living people
Atlas F.C. footballers
Chiapas F.C. footballers
Atlético Morelia players
Club Puebla players
Club León footballers
Liga MX players
Footballers from Sinaloa
Sportspeople from Mazatlán
Mexican footballers
Association football midfielders